Bokowe refers to the following places in Poland:

 Bokowe, Opole Voivodeship
 Bokowe, Podlaskie Voivodeship